William Thomas Cox (1809 - 18 March 1877) was a Conservative Party politician. Cox was elected Conservative MP for Derby in 1865 and held his seat until the election in 1868 in which he was defeated. Later, Cox attempted to regain his seat in 1874, but failed.

References

External links
 

Conservative Party (UK) MPs for English constituencies
UK MPs 1865–1868
1808 births
1877 deaths